Roblin station is a railway station in Roblin, Manitoba, Canada. It serves as a flag stop for Via Rail's Winnipeg–Churchill train.

The former station building is a 1½-story structure built by the Canadian Northern Railway in 1906 as a Third Class station building. Currently housing a restaurant, the station building was designated a national historic railway station in 1991.

Footnotes

External links 
Via Rail Station Information
Government of Manitoba Regional Map (A5)

1906 establishments in Manitoba
Designated Heritage Railway Stations in Manitoba
Canadian Register of Historic Places in Manitoba
Railway stations in Canada opened in 1906
Via Rail stations in Manitoba